Nutrition Reviews is a monthly peer-reviewed medical journal publishing review articles in the field of nutrition science. It was established in 1942 and was acquired by Oxford University Press in 2015. It is published on behalf of the International Life Sciences Institute. The editor-in-chief is Douglas Taren (The University of Arizona). According to the Journal Citation Reports, the journal has a 2017 impact factor of 5.788, ranking it 6th out of 81 journals in the category "Nutrition & Dietetics".

References

External links

Monthly journals
Oxford University Press academic journals
Nutrition and dietetics journals
Publications established in 1942
Review journals
English-language journals